Antigua and Barbuda competed at the 1988 Summer Olympics in Seoul, South Korea. Fifteen competitors, twelve men and three women, took part in nineteen events in four sports.

Competitors
The following is the list of number of competitors in the Games.

Athletics

Men
Track & road events

Field events

Women
Track & road events

Boxing

Men

Cycling

Two male cyclists represented Antigua and Barbuda in 1988.

Track
1000m time trial

Men's Sprint

Omnium

Sailing

Men

See also
Antigua and Barbuda at the 1987 Pan American Games

References

External links
Official Olympic Reports

Nations at the 1988 Summer Olympics
1988
Olympics